Victor Herman Balke (September 29, 1931) is a prelate of the Roman Catholic Church who served as bishop of the Diocese of Crookston in Minnesota from 1976 to 2007.

Biography

Early life 
Born on September 29, 1931, in Meppen, Illinois (in Calhoun County), Victor Balke's parents were Elizabeth Knese and Bernard Balke, Sr. He attended St. Joseph Grade School in Meppen as well as the Monterey Grade School. Balke graduated from Hardin County High School in 1949 and entered seminary in September 1949.

Priesthood 
Balke was ordained into the priesthood on May 24, 1958, by Bishop William A. O’Connor for the Diocese of Springfield.

Following his ordination,, Balke served as assistant pastor at the Cathedral of the Immaculate Conception Parish for four years and was chaplain at St. Joseph Home for the Aged. Later, he was named procurator, and then rector of the diocesan Seminary of the Immaculate Conception in Springfield, Illinois. He served on the Matrimonial Tribunal as synodal judge and defender of the bond. He was also the chairman of the diocesan Commission on Ecumenism and secretary-treasurer of the Priests’ Council.

Bishop of Crookston 
Balke was appointed as the sixth bishop of the Diocese of Crookston by Pope Paul VI on July 3, 1976.  He was consecrated by Archbishop John Roach on September 2, 1976. 

After reaching his 75th birthday, the mandatory retirement age for bishops, Balke submitted his letter of resignation as bishop of the Diocese of Crookston to Pope Benedict XVI.  The pope accepted Balke's resignation on September 28, 2007. Balke remained as apostolic administrator of the diocese until Father Michael Hoeppner was installed as its new bishop on November 30, 2007.

See also
 

 Catholic Church hierarchy
 Catholic Church in the United States
 Historical list of the Catholic bishops of the United States
 List of Catholic bishops of the United States
 Lists of patriarchs, archbishops, and bishops

References

External links
Roman Catholic Diocese of Crookston Official Site

Episcopal succession

1931 births
Living people
Roman Catholic bishops of Crookston
20th-century Roman Catholic bishops in the United States
21st-century Roman Catholic bishops in the United States
People from Calhoun County, Illinois
American tax resisters
Roman Catholic Diocese of Springfield in Illinois
Religious leaders from Illinois
Catholics from Illinois